Bentleigh Secondary College is a coeducational public high school in Bentleigh East, Victoria, Australia. Established in 1956, it has been renamed several times before becoming Bentleigh Secondary College.

Bentleigh Secondary College has recently been re-developed. In stage one of the building program, funded by the state government, a new performing arts centre, administration block, and sports stadium were built. The building that was previously the college library has been converted into a VCE centre. A new science block was also completed in late 2008, following the demolition of what was previously D-block and D-block.

Campus
The college is made up of eight main buildings:
 D-Block is used primarily for art, IT and LOTE classes. It also contains year 10 lockers.
 The Administration Block was built in stage one of the college's building program. It consists of offices, conference rooms, a staff room and a sick bay as well as a Food Tech room
 The Performing Arts Centre was converted in 2006 from the Bertrand-Mitchell Hall (a theatre building). While the same structure was kept, the interior was completely refurbished. The centre was renamed in 2009 to the 'Peter Stevens Performing Arts Centre'. The centre currently boasts a main theatre area, foyer, dance room, drama room, two music classrooms and music practise rooms. Featuring retractable tiered seating, it is also attached to the canteen.
 The Sports Stadium, informally known by students as "the barcode" due to its prominent design, boasts two sports courts and changerooms. Heavily utilised by sports and PE classes, the stadium is also rented to the community, and sports organisations such as basketball teams are based there.
 The VCE Centre was converted from the former library. It has an open plan style with teachers' desks at the centre, several classrooms, and generous study space. It is used by students, particularly those in year 12, undertaking VCE studies.
 The Science Block was completed under stage two of the college's building program, and incorporates the college library. Most of the Year 9 lockers are located beside this block as well as the Year 8's. Also known as D-Block
 The D-Block is where Year 11 & 12 lockers are and main classrooms. There are 7 classrooms and all except 3 are joined. D-Block is named after former school principal Hugh Jones.

The college grounds include a sustainable garden, a football oval and soccer pitches.

LOTE

Students learn Japanese and attend three periods of their elected language per week for Year 7 and 8. After Year 8, LOTE (Japanese) becomes an electives subject.

Gifted and Talented Program
The college has implemented a Gifted and Talented Program whereby students, based on the results of a standardised test undertaken before entering high school, of high potential to achieve are grouped into one class until the end of year nine. In this case, the class is 7.4, 8.4 and 9.4. 10.4 is renamed 10D which also contains the students from previous .4 classes and does Advanced English, Advanced Maths and Advanced Science.

Performing arts
Performing arts at Bentleigh Secondary College consists of music, drama and dance. With the option to study an instrument, there are several well-developed school bands. The Symponic Wind Ensemble is the most senior of the bands made up of brass, woodwind and percussion players.  This ensemble competed in the Advanced Concert Band section of the Melbourne School Bands festival for the first time in 2009. There is also a concert band, Intermediate Band and Year 7 Concert Band.  There are Senior, Intermediate and Junior Jazz Bands, as well as senior rock band which perform at the annual "Big Band Bogie" and on concert nights. In addition to these bands there are a dozen or so small ensembles such as brass ensemble and clarinet ensemble. Also new this year is the college choir, which is open for all students to join.
'Chicago: A Musical Vaudeville' is the school's production for 2011.
For each school production, the Music Department also organises a production band of students and staff to accompany the actors.

Fire incident
At approximately 3:00 am on 10 February 2008, 
two police officers saw smoke coming from the school and a car leaving this area. 
The fire has caused more than $100,000 in damage, 
however the decision of the officers to proceed to the cause of the smoke rather than pursue the culprits prevented further destruction.

Braided hair controversy
In March 2017, two sisters who attend the college were ordered to remove their hair braids or face consequences by school staff. The sisters, of South Sudanese descent, pointed out that the braids were the healthiest and best way to manage their hair and refused to remove them. The sisters accused the school of discrimination. Media coverage and public outcry resulted from the incident due to the school's perceived lack of racial sensitivity and understanding.

References

External links
 Official website

Educational institutions established in 1956
Public high schools in Melbourne
1956 establishments in Australia
Buildings and structures in the City of Glen Eira